Pierre Jean Launay (December 27, 1900 – April 23, 1982) was a French writer. He was born in Carrouges in the Lower Normandy region. His novel Léonie la bienheureuse met with notable success, winning both the Prix Renaudot and the Prix des Deux Magots in 1938.

Work 
1937: Le maître du logis, Denoël et Steele.
1938: Léonie la bienheureuse, Denoël et Steele, Prix Renaudot and Prix des Deux Magots.
1941: Les Héros aux mains vides, Corrêa.
1946 : La mort rode aux carrefours - Aide-mémoire, Nouvelles, Corrêa.
1948 : Corps à cœur, Corrêa.
1950 : Ludovic le possédé, Corrêa.
1954 : Grèce, Hachette (collection Les albums des guides bleus).
1955 : Dans les pas des héros et des dieux, Hachette (collection Dans les pas).
1959 : Îles grecques, Hachette (collection Les albums des guides bleus).
1966 : Aux portes de Trézène, Grasset (collection Les cahiers verts).
1972 : La grande demeure, Grasset.

References 

Prix des Deux Magots winners
Prix Renaudot winners
People from Orne
1900 births
1982 deaths
20th-century French novelists
French male novelists
20th-century French male writers